Maize line virus is a pathogenic plant virus.

External links
 ICTVdB - The Universal Virus Database: Maize line virus
 Family Groups - The Baltimore Method

Viral plant pathogens and diseases
Tombusviridae